Mitchell Park or Mitchell's Park may refer to:

 Mitchell Park, Victoria, a suburb of Ballarat
 Mitchell Park, South Australia, a suburb south of Adelaide
 Mitchell Park Football Club
 Mitchell Park, within the Cattai National Park near Sydney, New South Wales
 Mitchell Park Horticultural Conservatory, Milwaukee, Wisconsin
 Mitchell's Park, Durban, a county park and zoo outside Durban, South Africa
 L. Dale Mitchell Baseball Park, Norman, Oklahoma